Anielle Francisco da Silva (born 3 May 1985) is a Brazilian politician from the Workers' Party who has been Minister of Racial Equality in the second cabinet of Lula da Silva since 11 January 2023.

Family 
Her sister Marielle Franco, was also a politician who was assassinated in 2018. After her death, the family established the Marielle Franco Institute with the aim to seek justice and continue her work. Anielle was the director of the institute.

References

External links 

 Instagram
 Twitter

1985 births
Living people
Workers' Party (Brazil) politicians
21st-century Brazilian women politicians
Afro-Brazilian women
Brazilian politicians of African descent
Women government ministers of Brazil
Government ministers of Brazil